Reiss may refer to:

 Reiss (surname)
 Reiss (brand), fashion brand
 Reiss, Scotland
 Reiss relation in mathematics
 Reiss (ship), an historic steam tug -- see Northeastern Maritime Historical Foundation